Ewald Meltzer (11 August 1869 in Auerbach/Vogtland - 30 January 1940 in Herrnhut, Oberlausitz) was a German director of an asylum in Saxony whose work had an influence on the Nazis to justify their T-4 Euthanasia Program.

Meltzer was a vocal critic of Alfred Hoche and Karl Binding, whose polemic about "life unworthy of living", Die Freigabe der Vernichtung Lebensunwerten Lebens, sparked a controversy about euthanasia for people with disabilities.

According to Burleigh, Meltzer hotly disputed the claim that people with mental handicaps had lost the last vestiges of human personality, stressing instead their capacity and will to enjoy life. In "Das Problem der Abkürzung "lebensunwerten" Lebens" (1925), Meltzer wrote that it was "far more heroic to accept these beings to the best of one's abilities, to bring sunshine into their lives, and therewith to serve humanity." He claimed asylums for handicapped people were not only valuable centres of scientific research, but also tangible manifestations of Christian charity. (Burleigh at 21-22)

According to Mostert, "In an attempt to support his belief, Meltzer surveyed the parents of his patients to ascertain their perceptions of disability and euthanasia. To Meltzer's astonishment, the survey results showed a widely held contradiction among the parents that although they had strong emotional ties to their children, they simultaneously expressed, with varying degrees of qualification, a 'positive' attitude toward killing them. In fact, only a handful of respondents completely rejected all notions of euthanasia" (Proctor, 1988).

Meltzer's survey was later used as a major rationale for the killing of thousands of people with disabilities under the National Socialists.

References

Burleigh, M. Death and Deliverance: "Euthanasia" in Germany 1900-45. 273 (1994).
Mostert, Mark Useless Eaters: Disability as Genocidal Marker in Nazi Germany.
Proctor, R. (1988). Racial hygiene: Medicine under the Nazis. Cambridge: Harvard University Press.

1869 births
1940 deaths
People from Auerbach (Vogtland)
People from the Kingdom of Saxony
German psychiatrists